Borj el-Khadra, formerly known as Fort Saint, is the furthest south settlement in Tunisia. It is located in the Tataouine Governorate near the tripoint between Tunisia, Algeria, and Libya.

There is no legal way to cross the border at Borj el-Khadra.

References 

Populated places in Tataouine Governorate